The official 2017/2018 snooker world ranking points for the professional snooker players on the World Snooker Main Tour in the 2017–18 season are based on performances in ranking tournaments over a two-year rolling period. The rankings at the start of 2017/2018 season are determined by prize money earned in the 2015/2016 and 2016/2017 seasons and are updated after every tournament carrying ranking status; the players are re-ranked at the beginning of the current season after removing players relegated at the end of the previous season from the ranking list. As points are accrued from tournaments throughout the current season, the points from the corresponding tournaments from two seasons earlier are dropped. The rankings are used to set the official tournament seedings at various points throughout the season; even though the rankings are officially updated after every tournament carrying ranking status not all the rankings are used as seedings, and only the rankings officially used as seedings are documented below. The total points accumulated by the cut-off dates for the revised seedings are based on all the points up to that date in the 2017/2018 season, all of the points from the 2016/2017 season, and the points from the 2015/2016 season that have not yet been dropped.

Seeding revisions

Ranking points

Notes

References 

2017
Ranking points 2017
Ranking points 2018